Paul Leonard Newman (January 26, 1925 – September 26, 2008) was an American actor, film director, race car driver, philanthropist, and entrepreneur. He was the recipient of numerous awards, including an Academy Award, a BAFTA Award, three Golden Globe Awards, a Screen Actors Guild Award, a Primetime Emmy Award, a Silver Bear, a Cannes Film Festival Award, and the Jean Hersholt Humanitarian Award.

Born in Shaker Heights, Ohio, a suburb of Cleveland, Newman showed an interest in theater as a child and at age 10 performed in a stage production of Saint George and the Dragon at the Cleveland Play House. He received his Bachelor of Arts degree in drama and economics from Kenyon College in 1949. After touring with several summer stock companies including the Belfry Players, Newman attended the Yale School of Drama for a year before studying at the Actors Studio under Lee Strasberg. His first starring Broadway role was in William Inge's Picnic, and he starred in smaller roles for a few more films before receiving widespread attention and acclaim for his performances in Somebody Up There Likes Me (1956) and Cat on a Hot Tin Roof (1958).

Newman's major film roles include Eddie Felson in The Hustler (1961), Hud Bannon in Hud (1963), Lew Harper in Harper (1966), Luke Jackson in Cool Hand Luke (1967), Butch Cassidy in Butch Cassidy and the Sundance Kid (1969), Judge Roy Bean in The Life and Times of Judge Roy Bean (1972), Henry "Shaw" Gondorff in The Sting (1973), Doug Roberts in The Towering Inferno (1974),  Reggie Dunlop in Slap Shot (1977), Murphy in Fort Apache, The Bronx (1981), and as the voice of Doc Hudson in Cars (2006) as his final acting non-documentary role, with his archival voice recordings being used again in Cars 3 (2017), nine years after his death. A ten-time Oscar nominee, Newman was awarded an Academy Award for Best Actor for The Color of Money (1986).

Newman won several national championships as a driver in Sports Car Club of America road racing, and his race teams won several championships in open-wheel IndyCar racing. He was a co-founder of Newman's Own, a food company from which he donated all post-tax profits and royalties to charity. As of May 2021, these donations have totaled over US$570 million. In 1988, Newman founded the SeriousFun Children's Network, a global family of summer camps and programs for children with a serious illness which has served 1.3 million children and family members since its inception. In 2006, Newman also co-founded Safe Water Network with John Whitehead, former chairman of Goldman Sachs, and Josh Weston, former chairman of ADP, to improve access to safe water to underserved communities around the world.

Newman was married twice and fathered six children. He was the husband of Oscar-winning actress Joanne Woodward.

Early life
Newman was born on January 26, 1925, in Cleveland Heights, Ohio, and raised in nearby Shaker Heights, the second son of Theresa Garth (née Fetzer, Fetzko, or Fetsko; ; 1894–1982) and Arthur Sigmund Newman, Sr. (1893–1950), who ran a sporting goods store. His father was Jewish, the son of Simon Newman and Hannah Cohn, Hungarian Jewish and Polish Jewish emigrants, from Hungary and Congress Poland, respectively. Paul's mother was a practitioner of Christian Science. She was born to a Roman Catholic family in Peticse, Zemplén county, in the Kingdom of Hungary, Austro-Hungarian Empire (present-day Ptičie, Slovakia).  Newman's mother worked in his father's store, while raising Paul and his elder brother, Arthur.

Newman showed an early interest in the theater; his first role was at the age of seven, playing the court jester in a school production of Robin Hood. At age 10, Newman performed at the Cleveland Play House in a production of Saint George and the Dragon, and was a notable actor and alumnus of their Curtain Pullers children's theater program. Graduating from Shaker Heights High School in 1943, he briefly attended Ohio University in Athens, Ohio, where he was initiated into the Phi Kappa Tau fraternity.

Navy service 

Newman served in the United States Navy in World War II, in the Pacific theater. Initially, he enrolled in the Navy V-12 pilot training program at Yale University, but was dropped when his colorblindness was discovered. He later recounted that it was "a bit more complicated" than colorblindness. He also "couldn't do the mathematical things that being a pilot requires." A subsequent test found that he was not colorblind. Boot camp followed, with training as a radioman and rear gunner. He performed poorly as a gunner, and a friend from the service recounted in Newman's posthumous memoir that his friends lied to Navy trainers so he could pass. 

Qualifying in torpedo bombers in 1944, Aviation Radioman Third Class Newman was sent to Barbers Point, Hawaii. He was subsequently assigned to Pacific-based replacement torpedo squadrons VT-98, VT-99, and VT-100, responsible primarily for training replacement combat pilots and aircrewmen, with special emphasis on carrier landings. He later flew as a turret gunner in an Avenger torpedo bomber. As a radioman-gunner, his unit was assigned to the aircraft carrier , along with other replacements shortly before the Battle of Okinawa in the spring of 1945. The pilot of his aircraft had an earache and was grounded, as was his crew, including Newman. The rest of their squadron flew to the Bunker Hill. Days later, a kamikaze attack on the vessel killed several hundred crewmen and airmen, including other members of his unit.

In a 2011 interview, screenwriter Stewart Stern recounted that Newman drew on an incident from his Navy years as an "emotional trigger to express the character's trauma" when acting in the 1956 film The Rack. He said that Newman thought back to an incident in which his best friend was sliced to pieces on an aircraft carrier by a plane's propeller.

Career

Early roles 
After the war, Newman completed his Bachelor of Arts degree in drama and economics at Kenyon College in Gambier, Ohio, in 1949. Shortly after earning his degree, he joined several summer stock companies, most notably the Belfry Players in Wisconsin and the Woodstock Players in Illinois. He toured with them for three months, and developed his talents as a part of Woodstock Players. He later attended the Yale School of Drama for one year, before moving to New York City to study under Lee Strasberg at the Actors Studio. Oscar Levant wrote that Newman initially was hesitant to leave New York for Hollywood, and that Newman had said, "Too close to the cake. Also, no place to study."Newman arrived in New York City in 1951 with his first wife, Jackie Witte, taking up residence in the St. George section of Staten Island.

He made his Broadway theatre debut in the original production of William Inge's Picnic with Kim Stanley in 1953. While working on the production, he met Joanne Woodward, an understudy. The two married in 1958. He also appeared in the original Broadway production of The Desperate Hours in 1955. In 1959, he was in the original Broadway production of Sweet Bird of Youth with Geraldine Page and three years later starred with Page in the film version. During this time Newman started acting in television. His first credited role was in a 1952 episode of Tales of Tomorrow entitled "Ice from Space". In the mid-1950s, he appeared twice on CBS's Appointment with Adventure anthology series.

In February 1954, Newman appeared in a screen test with James Dean, directed by Gjon Mili, for East of Eden (1955). Newman was tested for the role of Aron Trask, Dean for the role of Aron's twin brother Cal. Dean won his part, but Newman lost out to Richard Davalos. That same year, as a last-minute replacement for Dean, he co-starred with Eva Marie Saint and Frank Sinatra in a live, color television broadcast of Our Town which was a musical adaptation of Thornton Wilder's stage play. After Dean's death, Newman replaced Dean in the role of a boxer in a television adaptation of Hemingway's story "The Battler", written by A. E. Hotchner, that was broadcast live on October 18, 1955. That performance led to his breakthrough role as Rocky Graziano in the film Somebody Up There Likes Me in 1956. The Dean connection had additional resonance. Newman was cast as Billy the Kid in The Left Handed Gun which was a role originally earmarked for Dean. Additionally, Dean was originally cast to play the role of Rocky Graziano in Somebody Up There Likes Me; however, with his death, Newman got the role.

Newman's first film for Hollywood was The Silver Chalice (1954), co-starring Italian actress Pier Angeli. The film was a box-office failure, and the actor would later acknowledge his disdain for it. In 1956, Newman garnered much attention and acclaim for the role of Rocky Graziano in Somebody Up There Likes Me, and the film also reunited him with Pier Angeli; their last film together. In 1958, he starred in Cat on a Hot Tin Roof (1958), opposite Elizabeth Taylor. The film was a box-office smash, and Newman garnered his first Academy Award nomination. Also in 1958, Newman starred in The Long, Hot Summer with his future wife Joanne Woodward, with whom he reconnected on the set in 1957 (they had first met in 1953). He won Best Actor at the 1958 Cannes Film Festival for this film. He and Woodward also appeared on screen earlier in 1958 in the Playhouse 90 television play The 80 Yard Run. The couple would go on to make a total of 16 films together.

Major films

Newman starred in The Young Philadelphians (1959) film which co-starred Barbara Rush, Robert Vaughn and Alexis Smith, and was directed by Vincent Sherman. He followed up with leads in Exodus (1960), From the Terrace, (1960), The Hustler (1961), Hud (1963), Torn Curtain (1966), Harper (1966), Hombre (1967), Cool Hand Luke (1967), The Towering Inferno (1974), Slap Shot (1977), Absence of Malice (1981), The Verdict (1982), and Nobody's Fool (1994). He teamed up with fellow actor Robert Redford and director George Roy Hill for Butch Cassidy and the Sundance Kid (1969) and The Sting (1973). After his marriage to Woodward they appeared together in The Long, Hot Summer (1958), Rally Round the Flag, Boys!, (1958), From the Terrace (1960), Paris Blues (1961), A New Kind of Love (1963), Winning (1969), WUSA (1970), playing Harper for a second time in The Drowning Pool (1975), Harry & Son (1984), and Mr. and Mrs. Bridge (1990). They starred in the HBO miniseries Empire Falls, but did not share any scenes.

In addition to starring in and directing Harry & Son, Newman directed four feature films starring Woodward. They were Rachel, Rachel (1968), based on Margaret Laurence's A Jest of God; the screen version of the Pulitzer Prize–winning play The Effect of Gamma Rays on Man-in-the-Moon Marigolds (1972); the television screen version of the Pulitzer Prize-winning play The Shadow Box (1980); and a screen version of Tennessee Williams' The Glass Menagerie (1987). Twenty-five years after The Hustler, Newman reprised his role of "Fast Eddie" Felson in the Martin Scorsese–directed film The Color of Money (1986), for which he won the Academy Award for Best Actor. In 1994, Newman played alongside Tim Robbins as the character Sidney J. Mussburger in the Coen brothers' comedy The Hudsucker Proxy.

In mid-1987, Newman sued Universal Pictures for allegedly failing to properly account for revenues from video distribution of four of his films made for Universal, and Universal owed him at least $1 million participation for the home video versions of The Sting, Slap Shot, Winning and Sometimes a Great Notion. The complaint claimed that Universal accounted for the cassette revenues in a way that improperly decreased amounts due to Newman, with the actor wanting a full accounting along with $2 million in damages.

21st-century roles
In 2003, Newman appeared in a Broadway revival of Wilder's Our Town, receiving a Tony Award nomination for his performance. PBS and the cable network Showtime aired a taping of the production, and Newman was nominated for an Emmy Award for Outstanding Lead Actor in a Miniseries or TV Movie.

Newman's last live action movie appearance was as a conflicted mob boss in the 2002 film Road to Perdition opposite Tom Hanks, for which he was nominated for an Academy Award for Best Supporting Actor. His last live action appearance overall, although he continued to provide voice work for films, was in 2005 in the HBO mini-series Empire Falls (based on the Pulitzer Prize-winning novel by Richard Russo) in which he played the dissolute father of the protagonist, Miles Roby, and for which he won a Golden Globe and a Primetime Emmy. In keeping with his strong interest in car racing, he provided the voice of Doc Hudson, a retired anthropomorphic race car, in Pixar's Cars (2006). This was his final role in a major feature film as well as his only animated film role. Almost nine years after his death, he appeared as Doc in the third film, Cars 3 (2017), through the use of archive recordings, for which he received billing.

Newman retired from acting in May 2007, saying: "You start to lose your memory, you start to lose your confidence, you start to lose your invention. So I think that's pretty much a closed book for me." He came out of retirement to record narration for the 2007 documentary Dale, about the life of NASCAR driver Dale Earnhardt, and for the 2008 documentary The Meerkats, which is his final film role overall.

Philanthropy
With writer A. E. Hotchner, Newman founded Newman's Own, a line of food products, in 1982. The brand started with salad dressing and has expanded to include pasta sauce, lemonade, popcorn, salsa, and wine, among other things. Newman established a policy that all proceeds, after taxes, would be donated to charity. He co-wrote a memoir about the subject with Hotchner, Shameless Exploitation in Pursuit of the Common Good. Among other awards, Newman's Own co-sponsors the PEN/Newman's Own First Amendment Award, a $25,000 reward designed to recognize those who protect the First Amendment as it applies to the written word.

One beneficiary of his philanthropy is the Hole in the Wall Gang Camp, a residential summer camp for seriously ill children located in Ashford, Connecticut, which Newman co-founded in 1988. It is named after the gang in his film Butch Cassidy and the Sundance Kid (1969), and the real-life, historic Hole-in-the-Wall outlaw hangout in the mountains of northern Wyoming. Newman's college fraternity, Phi Kappa Tau, adopted his Connecticut Hole in the Wall camp as their "national philanthropy" in 1995. The original camp has expanded to become several Hole in the Wall Camps in the U.S., Ireland, France, and Israel.

In 1983, Newman became a major donor for The Mirror Theater Ltd, alongside Dustin Hoffman and Al Pacino, matching a grant from Laurence Rockefeller. Newman was inspired to invest by his connection with Lee Strasberg, as Lee's then daughter-in-law Sabra Jones was the founder and producing artistic director of The Mirror. Paul Newman remained a friend of the company until his death and discussed at numerous times possible productions in which he could star with his wife, Joanne Woodward.

In June 1999, Newman donated $250,000 to Catholic Relief Services to aid refugees in Kosovo.

On June 1, 2007, Kenyon College announced that Newman had donated $10 million to the school to establish a scholarship fund as part of the college's $230 million fund-raising campaign. Newman and Woodward were honorary co-chairs of a previous campaign.

Newman was one of the founders of the Committee Encouraging Corporate Philanthropy (CECP). Newman was named the Most Generous Celebrity of 2008 by Givingback.org. He contributed $20,857,000 for the year of 2008 to the Newman's Own Foundation, which distributes funds to a variety of charities.

Upon Newman's death, the Italian newspaper (a "semi-official" paper of the Holy See) L'Osservatore Romano published a notice lauding Newman's philanthropy. It also commented that "Newman was a generous heart, an actor of a dignity and style rare in Hollywood quarters."

Newman was responsible for preserving lands around Westport, Connecticut. He lobbied the state's governor for funds for the 2011 Aspetuck Land Trust in Easton. In 2011, Paul Newman's estate gifted land to Westport to be managed by the Aspetuck Land Trust.

Political activism

Newman was a lifelong Democrat, although he endorsed and voted for Independent candidate John B. Anderson in 1980, who was a liberal Republican, instead of the incumbent Democratic president, Jimmy Carter. For Newman's support of Eugene McCarthy in 1968 (and effective use of television commercials in California) and his opposition to the Vietnam War, Newman was placed nineteenth on Richard Nixon's enemies list, which Newman claimed was his greatest accomplishment. In 1964, he and his wife Joanne Woodward supported Lyndon B. Johnson for president. During the 1968 general election, Newman supported Democratic nominee Hubert Humphrey and appeared in a pre-election night telethon for him. He was also described as a "vocal supporter" of gay rights and same-sex marriage.

Newman linked with the so-called Malibu Mafia to promote progressive issues in politics. This was a group of wealthy men in the Greater Los Angeles area who met to discuss politics. Backed by them, Newman and his wife went to Washington in 1976 to speak in favor of breaking up Big Oil into separate components. Newman supported their 1980s effort to establish a bilateral Nuclear Freeze to stop the proliferation of nuclear weapons in the US and the Soviet Union. He said he would stand up for Walter Mondale in the 1984 presidential election as long as there was cold Budweiser and Nuclear Freeze involved.

In January 1995, Newman was the chief investor of a group, including the writer E.L. Doctorow and the editor Victor Navasky, that bought the progressive-left wing periodical The Nation. Newman was an occasional writer for the publication.

Consistent with his work for liberal causes, Newman publicly supported Ned Lamont's candidacy in the 2006 Connecticut Democratic Primary against Senator Joe Lieberman, and was even rumored as a candidate himself, until Lamont emerged as a credible alternative. He donated to Chris Dodd's presidential campaign. Newman earlier donated money to Bill Richardson's campaign for president in 2008.

Newman attended the March on Washington on August 28, 1963, and was also present at the first Earth Day event in Manhattan on April 22, 1970.

Newman was concerned about global warming and supported nuclear energy development as a solution.

Auto racing

Newman was an auto racing enthusiast, and first became interested in motorsports ("the first thing that I ever found I had any grace in") while training at the Watkins Glen Racing School for the filming of Winning, a 1969 film. Because of his love and passion for racing, Newman agreed in 1971 to star in and to host his first television special, Once Upon a Wheel, on the history of auto racing. It was produced and directed by David Winters, who co-owned a number of racing cars with Newman. Newman's first professional event as a racer was in 1972 at Thompson International Speedway, quietly entered as "P. L. Newman", by which he continued to be known in the racing community.

He was a frequent competitor in Sports Car Club of America (SCCA) events for the rest of the decade, eventually winning four national championships. He later drove in the 1979 24 Hours of Le Mans in Dick Barbour's Porsche 935 and finished in second place. Newman reunited with Barbour in 2000 to compete in the Petit Le Mans.

From the mid-1970s to the early 1990s, he drove for the Bob Sharp Racing team, racing mainly Datsuns (later rebranded as Nissans) in the Trans-Am Series. He became closely associated with the brand during the 1980s, even appearing in commercials for them in Japan and having a special edition of the Nissan Skyline named after him. At the age of 70 years and eight days, Newman became the oldest driver to date to be part of a winning team in a major sanctioned race, winning in his class at the 1995 24 Hours of Daytona. Among his last major races were the Baja 1000 in 2004 and the 24 Hours of Daytona once again in 2005.

During the 1976 auto racing season, Newman became interested in forming a professional auto racing team and contacted Bill Freeman who introduced Newman to professional auto racing management, and their company specialized in Can-Am, Indy Cars, and other high-performance racing automobiles. The team was based in Santa Barbara, California and commuted to Willow Springs International Motorsports Park for much of its testing sessions.

Their Newman Freeman Racing team was very competitive in the North American Can-Am series in their Budweiser sponsored Chevrolet-powered Spyder NFs. Newman and Freeman began a long and successful partnership with the Newman Freeman Racing team in the Can-Am series which culminated in the Can-Am Team Championship trophy in 1979. Newman was associated with Freeman's established Porsche racing team which allowed both Newman and Freeman to compete in SCCA and IMSA racing events together, including the Sebring 12-hour endurance sports car race. This car was sponsored by Beverly Porsche/Audi. Freeman was Sports Car Club of America's Southern Pacific National Champion during the Newman Freeman period. Later Newman co-founded Newman/Haas Racing with Carl Haas, a Champ Car team, in 1983, going on to win eight drivers' championships under his ownership. Newman was also briefly an owner in the NASCAR Winston Cup Series when he co-founded a research-and-development #18 team with Hendrick Motorsports' Greg Sacks behind the wheel – the team shut down after two seasons after losing their primary sponsor. The 1996 racing season was chronicled in the IMAX film Super Speedway (1997), which Newman narrated. He was a partner in the Atlantic Championship team Newman Wachs Racing. Newman voiced Doc Hudson in Cars (2006).

Having said he would quit "when I embarrass myself", Newman competed into his 80s, winning at Lime Rock in what former co-driver Sam Posey called a "brutish Corvette" displaying his age as its number: 81. He took the pole in his last professional race, in 2007 at Watkins Glen International, and in a 2008 run at Lime Rock, arranged by friends, he reportedly still did 9/10ths of his best time.

Newman was posthumously inducted into the SCCA Hall of Fame at the national convention in Las Vegas, Nevada on February 21, 2009. Lime Rock Park's No Name Straight was renamed Paul Newman Straight in 2022.

Newman's racing life was chronicled in the documentary Winning: The Racing Life of Paul Newman (2015).

Motorsports career results

SCCA National Championship Runoffs

Complete 24 Hours of Le Mans results
(key)

Personal life

Newman was married twice. His first marriage was to Jackie Witte from 1949 to 1958. They had a son, Scott (19501978), and two daughters, Susan (born 1953) and Stephanie Kendall (born 1954). Scott, who appeared in films including The Towering Inferno (1974), Breakheart Pass (1975), and the 1977 film Fraternity Row, died in November 1978 from a drug overdose. Newman started the Scott Newman Center for drug abuse prevention in memory of his son. Susan is a documentary filmmaker and philanthropist, and has Broadway and screen credits, including a starring role as one of four Beatles fans in I Wanna Hold Your Hand (1978), and also a small role opposite her father in Slap Shot. She also received an Emmy nomination as co-producer of his telefilm, The Shadow Box.

Newman met actress Joanne Woodward in 1953, on the production of Picnic on Broadway. It was Newman's debut; Woodward was an understudy. Shortly after filming The Long, Hot Summer in 1957, he divorced Witte to marry Woodward. The Newmans moved to East 11th Street in Manhattan, before buying a home and raising their family in Westport, Connecticut. They were one of the first Hollywood movie star couples to choose to raise their families outside California. They remained married for 50 years until his death in 2008. Woodward has said "He's very good looking and very sexy and all of those things, but all of that goes out the window and what is finally left is, if you can make somebody laugh... And he sure does keep me laughing." Newman has attributed their relationship success to "some combination of lust and respect and patience. And determination."

They had three daughters: Elinor "Nell" Teresa (b. 1959), Melissa "Lissy" Stewart (b. 1961), and Claire "Clea" Olivia (b. 1965). Newman was well known for his devotion to his wife and family. When once asked about his reputation for fidelity, he famously quipped, "Why go out for a hamburger when you have steak at home?" He also said that he never met anyone who had as much to lose as he did. In his profile on 60 Minutes, he admitted he once left Woodward after a fight, walked around the outside of the house, knocked on the front door and explained to Joanne he had nowhere to go. Newman directed Nell alongside her mother in the films Rachel, Rachel and The Effect of Gamma Rays on Man-in-the-Moon Marigolds. Newman and Woodward also acted as mentors to Allison Janney. They met her while she was a freshman at Kenyon College during a play which Newman was directing.

Film critic Shawn Levy, in his biography Paul Newman: A Life (2009), alleged that Newman had an affair in the late 1960s with divorcée Nancy Bacon, a Hollywood journalist, which lasted one and a half years. In an article in the Irish Independent, which stated also that Levy's claims "caused outrage" and were widely considered "an attempt to sully the image of a revered cinematic legend and committed philanthropist", the affair was reportedly denied by a friend of Newman's wife Joanne, who said she was upset by the claim. Levy criticised the tabloid newspaper, The New York Post, which had a long-standing feud with Newman, for focusing on and emphasizing this aspect of his biography.

He and Woodward were the subject of a 2022 docuseries by Ethan Hawke, The Last Movie Stars, which was broadcast on HBO Max. The docuseries was based upon tapes compiled by his friend, the Stewart Stern, for a memoir that Newman abandoned but which was published in 2022 as The Extraordinary Life of An Ordinary Man.

Jewish identity 
Newman followed no religion as an adult, but called himself a Jew, "because it's more of a challenge". When he applied to Kenyon College after the Navy he gave his religion as "Christian Scientist," but apart from that he did not deny that he was Jewish. He recounted in his posthumous memoirs having a "strong sense of otherness" as a youth because he was half-Jewish. His heritage "got in the way of my sitting at the 'A' table, which was important to me," but he received no instruction on his Jewish heritage. He only knew that "if you were Jewish, some avenues were shut to you," and that "hurt me and my brother a great deal." Newman deflected the pain with humor, sometimes doing Yiddish voices "for laughs." He was excluded from a high school fraternity because he was Jewish, and got into a "bloody fight" in the Navy because a sailor used an anti-Semitic slur. A family friend recounted that the "stigma" of being Jewish was strong in Shaker Heights at the time. "Paul didn't seem Jewish at all, but he paid a price, he had a rough time."

After he began appearing in films, Newman made a point of not changing his name. When he was being considered for the role of Terry Malloy in On the Waterfront, producer Sam Spiegel asked him to "get rid of 'Paul Newman." Newman’s response to Spiegel, who sometimes was credited as "S.P. Eagle," was "What do you want me to change it to, 'S.P. Ewman'?"

Illness and death
Newman was scheduled to make his professional stage directing debut with the Westport Country Playhouse's 2008 production of John Steinbeck's Of Mice and Men, but he stepped down on May 23, 2008, citing his health concerns.

In June 2008, it was widely reported in the press that he had been diagnosed with lung cancer and was receiving treatment for the condition at the Memorial Sloan Kettering Cancer Center in New York City. A. E. Hotchner, who partnered in the 1980s with Newman to start Newman's Own, told the Associated Press in an interview in mid-2008 that Newman had told him about being afflicted with the disease about 18 months earlier. Newman's spokesman told the press that the star was "doing nicely", but neither confirmed nor denied that he had cancer. The actor was a heavy cigarette smoker until he quit in 1986.

Newman died at his home in Westport, Connecticut on the morning of September 26, 2008. He was cremated after a private funeral service.

Filmography

Partial theater credits
"Harvey" playing the lead, Elwood P. Dowd – Belfry Players Theater, Williams Bay, Wisconsin. 1949
 Phaedra by Jean Racine and Robert Collington Ackart – Yale, 1951
 Beethoven by Dorothy B. Bland – Yale, 1952
 Picnic by William Inge – New York, 1953–54
 The Desperate Hours – New York, 1955
 Sweet Bird of Youth by Tennessee Williams – New York, 1959–60
 Baby Want a Kiss – New York, 1964
 Love Letters – Westport, 2000
 The Constant Wife – Westport, 2000
 Our Town by Thornton Wilder – Westport, New York, 2002–2003
 Trumbo – New York, 2004

Awards and nominations

Newman was nominated for an Academy Award in five different decades. In addition to awards Newman won for specific roles, he received an honorary Academy Award in 1986 for his "many and memorable and compelling screen performances" and the Jean Hersholt Humanitarian Award for his charity work in 1994.

In 1992, Newman and his wife Joanne Woodward were recipients of Kennedy Center Honors. In 1994, the couple received the Award for Greatest Public Service Benefiting the Disadvantaged, an award given annually by Jefferson Awards.

Newman won Best Actor at the Cannes Film Festival for The Long, Hot Summer and the Silver Bear at the Berlin International Film Festival for Nobody's Fool.

In 1968, Newman was named Man of the Year by Harvard University's performance group, the Hasty Pudding Theatricals.

The 2008 edition of Sport Movies & TV – Milano International FICTS Fest was dedicated to his memory.

In 2015, the U.S. Postal Service issued a 'forever stamp' honoring Newman, which went on sale September 18, 2015. It features a 1980 photograph of Newman by photographer Steve Schapiro, accompanied by text that reads: 'Actor/Philanthropist'.

Since the 1970s, Newman Day is an event celebrated at Kenyon College, Bates College, Princeton University, and some other American colleges. On Newman Day, students try to drink 24 beers in 24 hours, based on a quote attributed to Newman about there being 24 beers in a case, and 24 hours in a day, and that this is surely not a mere coincidence. In 2004, Newman requested that Princeton University disassociate the event from his name, due to the fact that he did not endorse the behavior. He cited his creation in 1980 of the Scott Newman Center, "dedicated to the prevention of substance abuse through education". Princeton disavowed any responsibility for the event, responding that Newman Day is not sponsored, endorsed, or encouraged by the university itself and is solely an unofficial event among students.

On October 26, 2017, Paul Newman's Rolex Daytona wristwatch was auctioned in New York by Phillips Auctions for $17.5 million, making it one of the most expensive wristwatches ever sold at an auction.

On September 3, 2022, Lime Rock Park, a road course in Lakeville, Connecticut, named the straight of the circuit past the Esses before The Uphill the Paul Newman Straight during the Historic Festival 40.

Bibliography
 Newman, Paul; Hotchner, A. E. Newman's Own Cookbook. Simon & Schuster, 1998; .
 Newman, Paul; Hotchner, A. E. Shameless Exploitation in Pursuit of the Common Good. Doubleday Publishing, 2003; .

See also
 List of peace activists
List of select Jewish racing drivers

Notes

References

Further reading

 
 
 
 
 
 
 
 
 
 
 
 
 
 
 
 Thomson, Kenneth. The Films of Paul Newman. 1978; .

External links

 
 
 
 
 
 
 Newman's Own
 Newman's Own Foundation

1925 births
2008 deaths
20th-century American businesspeople
20th-century American Jews
20th-century American male actors
20th Century Studios contract players
21st-century American businesspeople
21st-century American Jews
21st-century American male actors
24 Hours of Daytona drivers
24 Hours of Le Mans drivers
Academy Honorary Award recipients
Actors from Shaker Heights, Ohio
American civil rights activists
American cookbook writers
American food company founders
American film producers
American humanitarians
American male film actors
American male non-fiction writers
American male television actors
American people of Hungarian-Jewish descent
American people of Polish-Jewish descent
American people of Slovak descent
American philanthropists
American social activists
Audiobook narrators
Best Actor Academy Award winners
Best Director Golden Globe winners
Best Foreign Actor BAFTA Award winners
Best Supporting Actor Golden Globe (television) winners
Burials in Connecticut
Businesspeople from Connecticut
Businesspeople from New York (state)
Businesspeople from Ohio
Cannes Film Festival Award for Best Actor winners
Cecil B. DeMille Award Golden Globe winners
Commandeurs of the Ordre des Arts et des Lettres
Connecticut Democrats
David di Donatello winners
Deaths from lung cancer in Connecticut
Film directors from Connecticut
Film directors from Ohio
Film producers from Connecticut
Film producers from Ohio
IndyCar Series team owners
Jean Hersholt Humanitarian Award winners
Jewish American male actors
Jewish American military personnel
Jewish American non-fiction writers
Jewish American sportspeople
Jewish film people
Kennedy Center honorees
Kenyon College alumni
Male actors from Cleveland
Male actors from Connecticut
Male Western (genre) film actors
Method actors
Military personnel from Connecticut
Military personnel from Ohio
New Star of the Year (Actor) Golden Globe winners
Newman family (acting)
Nixon's Enemies List
Ohio University alumni
Outstanding Performance by a Male Actor in a Miniseries or Television Movie Screen Actors Guild Award winners
Outstanding Performance by a Supporting Actor in a Miniseries or Movie Primetime Emmy Award winners
People from Cleveland Heights, Ohio
People from St. George, Staten Island
People from Westport, Connecticut
Racing drivers from Connecticut
Racing drivers from Ohio
Recipients of the Four Freedoms Award
SCCA National Championship Runoffs winners
Screen Actors Guild Life Achievement Award
Silver Bear for Best Actor winners
Sportspeople from Shaker Heights, Ohio
The Nation (U.S. magazine) people
Trans-Am Series drivers
United States Navy personnel of World War II
United States Navy sailors
Writers from Connecticut
Writers from Ohio
Yale School of Drama alumni
American memoirists